South of Wawa is a 1991 Canadian comedy film. It was written by Lori Lansens and directed by Robert Boyd.

The film stars Rebecca Jenkins as Lizette, a woman stuck in an unhappy marriage who organizes a road trip with her coworker Cheryl Ann (Catherine Fitch) to see Dan Hill in concert. Although the film's title alludes to the Northern Ontario town of Wawa, the film is actually set in the Western Ontario town of Stayner.

The film was released on VHS in 1995 in Canada by Cineplex Odeon, but as of April 19, 2010, a DVD of the film has yet to be announced.

Plot 
Lizette acquires four front-row tickets to the Dan Hill concert in Toronto, Ontario - one for her, one for her husband, Terry (Scott Renderer), one for Simon (Andrew Miller), and one for Simon's date. At the very last minute, Simon's date cancels and the group decides to invite Cheryl Ann to fill the seat.

Cheryl Ann becomes a memorable character not far into the film. She is eager, possesses an open attitude, and has a positive outlook on life no matter what comes at her. Her mother is dying, and she wishes to bring her to Greece for treatment from a "miracle man." Her car sometimes doesn't start and most of the time she ends up walking all the way to her job with Lizette at the donut shop. Despite the unfortunate events she is constantly victim to, Cheryl Ann sees the good in everything. 

Lizette wants nothing more but to escape their small town of Stayner and everything in it, including her coworker Cheryl Ann. So when she receives the news that Cheryl Ann will be joining the group for the trip, she is anything but amused. The problem is that Simon will not go on the trip without a date, and Terry will not go without Simon. Both men would rather stay in town and attend the local hockey game, however Lizette wants this trip to be a success and therefore allows Cheryl Ann to come along.

Due to unforeseen circumstances, the evening does not go according to plan and the friends must examine their relationships with each other and others in town.

Cast
  Catherine Fitch as Cheryl Ann
  Rebecca Jenkins as Lizette
  Scott Renderer as Terry
  Andrew Miller as Simon
  Samantha Langevin as Helen
  Stuart Clow as Cam
  Dawn Greenhalgh as Donna
  Elias Zarou as Joe
  Stephanie Forder as Darlene
  George Touliatos as Serge
  Michael Gencher as John "The Polack"
  Alyson Court as Shannon
  Mark Wilson as Sgt. Tom Goodie
  Helen Hughes as Mrs. Deneau
  Elena Kudaba as Gramma Soplinski

Soundtrack 
The film's soundtrack includes songs by Cowboy Junkies, Rickie Lee Jones, Lyle Lovett and Lee Aaron.

References

External links
 

1991 films
English-language Canadian films
Canadian comedy films
Films set in Ontario
1991 comedy films
1990s English-language films
1990s Canadian films